Charles Edward Church (January 3, 1835 – January 3, 1906) was a Canadian politician.

Early life and education
Born in Tancook Island, Lunenburg County, Nova Scotia, the son of Charles Lott Anthony Church and Sarah Hiltz, Church was educated in Chester and Truro, Nova Scotia.

Career
He was a school teacher for over ten years and then he started in business as a merchant. In 1884, Church married Henrietta A. Pugsley. He was first elected to the House of Commons of Canada in 1872 for Lunenburg. A Liberal, he was re-elected in 1874 and was defeated in 1878. From 1874 to 1878, he was Liberal Whip in the House of Commons for the Maritime Provinces.

He was elected in 1882 to the Legislative Assembly of Nova Scotia and sat there until 1902 when he was called to the Senate. Church was Provincial Secretary of Nova Scotia for two years in the William Thomas Pipes administration, and Commissioner of Public Works and Mines for 15 years, in the William Stevens Fielding and George Henry Murray administrations.  He was called to the Senate on February 8, 1902 on the advice of Wilfrid Laurier representing the senatorial division of Lunenburg, Nova Scotia. He served until his death in 1906.

He was a grandson of Charles Lot Church.

Electoral record

References

External links
 

1835 births
1906 deaths
Canadian senators from Nova Scotia
Liberal Party of Canada MPs
Liberal Party of Canada senators
Members of the House of Commons of Canada from Nova Scotia
Nova Scotia Liberal Party MLAs
People from Lunenburg County, Nova Scotia